Waiting Patiently (foaled 24 June 2011) is a Thoroughbred horse competing in National Hunt racing. He tasted Grade 1 success in the Ascot Chase, beating the famous Cue Card. The horse is being trained by Ruth Jefferson.

References 

2011 racehorse births
Racehorses bred in Ireland